The Fox Valley Association is an athletic conference comprising ten high schools located within the Fox Valley region of northeastern Wisconsin. The management of the conference is vested in the principals of the member schools, who determine the rules governing the eligibility of athletes and the schedules. Rules and regulations may not be less restrictive than those of the Wisconsin Interscholastic Athletic Association.

History
The Conference was formed in 1970 when the Appleton Area teams split from the Fox River Valley Conference teams  and joined up with the suburban Fox Valley teams. Oshkosh North and Appleton North joined the conference when the schools were built in 1972 and 1995, respectively. In 2010, The Wisconsin Valley Conference needed assistance in football scheduling. Therefore, the WIAA merged both conferences to form the Valley Football Association. Due to the conference subsequently having 16 teams and thus the inability to have all teams play one another in a two-month period, the conference was forced to split into two divisions: North & South. In 2014, Hortonville High School replaced original member Menasha High School, who departed the FVA for the Bay Conference. Menasha cited the school's declining enrollment and inability to compete with the larger FVA schools as the reason for the move.

Due to the COVID-19 pandemic, some members of the FVA joined some members of the Fox River Classic Conference and Wisconsin Valley Conference to form the 20-team football-only Fox Valley Classic Conference, which will play in spring 2021.

Members

Associate members

Former members

Sponsored sports
The conference supports the following sports:

Girls are allowed to participate in wrestling.

Notes

External links
 

Wisconsin high school sports conferences
1970 establishments in Wisconsin